Juan Bautista Rondeau (1735 – 1813) was an officer of the Spanish army of French origin, who served in Buenos Aires and Montevideo during the Viceroyalty of Peru and Viceroyalty of the Rio de la Plata, He took part in the Second Cevallos expedition and the British invasions of the Río de la Plata, as part of the veteran forces of the Province of Córdoba.

He was born in La Rochelle, Aquitaine, the son of Pierre Rondeau and Catherine Bourgeois, belonging to a distinguished French family. 
He possibly arrived in the Río de la Plata as a soldier of the volunteer battalion of Catalonia in January 1762. He served for nine years in the Batallon de Infanteria of Santa Fe, serving in the Regimiento de Dragones de Buenos Aires since 1771. He took an active part in the defense of the Fortaleza de Santa Teresa, occurred during the Spanish Portuguese war. 

In 1785 he was appointed as a military commander in Minas, Uruguay, a position he held until 1790. He served in the veteran corps of the Regimiento de Voluntarios de Córdoba during the English Invasions of the Río de la Plata. After the May Revolution he went on to serve under the orders of the Primera Junta, supporting the emancipatory cause until his death.

Juan Bautista Rondeau was married in  Buenos Aires to Lorenza Pereira, daughter of Ricardo Pereyra and Maria Josefa Cabral, belonging to a Creole family of Portuguese roots. His son, José Rondeau y Pereyra, served as Supreme Director of the United Provinces of the Río de la Plata in 1815.

References

External links 
Bautismos 1752-1775
Juan Bautista Rondeau - Foja de Servicios

1735 births
1813 deaths
People from Buenos Aires
Spanish colonial governors and administrators
People from La Rochelle
Argentine Army officers
Argentine lieutenant colonels
French emigrants to Spain